Campagne (meaning "countryside") is a restaurant in Kilkenny, Ireland. It is a fine dining restaurant that was awarded a Michelin star each year from 2014 to present.

Head chef Gareth Byrne, formerly of Chapter One, opened the restaurant in 2008.

Awards
 Michelin star: 2014, 2015, 2016, 2017, 2018, 2019, 2020
 Georgina Campbell's Restaurant of the Year Award: 2010.

See also
List of Michelin starred restaurants in Ireland

References

External links
Official Site

Michelin Guide starred restaurants in Ireland